Viana do Castelo is a town and a municipality in northern Portugal. It may also refer to:

 Viana do Castelo District, in northwest Portugal
 Roman Catholic Diocese of Viana do Castelo, Portugal
 Viana do Castelo-class patrol vessel, a vessel of the Portuguese Navy